The Grossreifling Limestone is a geologic formation in Austria. It preserves fossils dating back to the Triassic period.

See also 

 List of fossiliferous stratigraphic units in Austria

References

External links 
 

Geologic formations of Austria
Triassic System of Europe
Triassic Austria
Limestone formations